Grimaldi is a fraction of 281 inhabitants in the municipality of Ventimiglia, in the province of Imperia. It is located near the French border of Ponte San Luigi. The oldest inhabited centre, located at 220 m, takes the name of Grimaldi Superiore, to distinguish it from the houses built along the State Road 1 (SS1) Aurelia, which makes up Grimaldi Inferiore.

Etymology
The origin of the toponym Grimaldi would derive from the Prince of Monaco Charles I who, during 1351, purchased these lands between the Vallone della Mortola and Garavan (Menton) and the top of the hill. Over the centuries the area changed its name several times: from "Grimalde" (quoted in 1514) to "Grimaude" (1655), and again "Grimardi" in 1760 until the current version of "Grimaldi".

History
James Henry Bennett was an English doctor who helped popularize the French Riviera as a Winter holiday destination in the 19th century with his 1861 book Winter and Spring on the Shores of the Mediterranean. “In 1865 I bought in Grimaldi, in Italy, some terraces planted with lemon and olive trees, some bare rocks and an old ruined tower. All this is located a hundred meters above sea level, on the rocky slope overlooking the road to Genoa, a short distance from the border of Ponte San Luigi. The terrain, facing south-west, is protected from the north winds and offers perhaps the most beautiful view possible of the [sic] amphitheater of Menton". He will immediately get to work and create the first acclimatization garden on the Riviera preceding the Hanburys.

On December 7, 1944, a German patrol of the 34th Infantry Division (Wehrmacht), led by a local spy, broke into the "Vittoria" hotel and captured three families who had found shelter there. The twelve prisoners were then taken out of the hotel and shot.

Historically Grimaldi followed the events of Ventimiglia.

Main sights 

Due to its position and height, Grimaldi has extensive views of Menton, the Principality of Monaco and the French Riviera. In very terse days the full coast of France, Tuscany and the island of Corsica are visible.

The caves of the Balzi Rossi have proved rich in palaeolithic remains of the Quaternary period. Remains of a family of Cro-Magnon people were discovered, with several skeletons of men, women and children.

The Giardini Botanici Hanbury (Hanbury Botanical Gardens), surrounding the villa of Sir Thomas Hanbury, La Mortola, are the biggest in Italy, with a number of varieties of tropical and sub-tropical species that thrive in this mild climate.

Monuments and places of interest

Religious architectures 
The local parish church, located in the historic centre, is dedicated to the Guardian Angels; the parish was established in 1947.

Civil architectures 
The Voronoff castle is located in corso Mentone 50 in the hamlet of Grimaldi Inferiore. It owes its notoriety to the French surgeon and researcher of Russian extraction Serge Voronoff

Military architectures 
The Grimaldi tower (also known as the Dogana tower, the Saracen tower and the Corsi tower).

Natural areas 
In the nearby locality of the Balzi Rossi, in the so-called "Grotta dei Fanciulli", in addition to the numerous Cro-Magnon Europoids 1.90 high and very muscular, the canon de Villeneuve discovered in 1901, 8.5 m deep, two very well preserved skeletons of an old woman and a boy, buried under a cover where the remains of Cro-Magnon men were found; however, those two finds seemed much older and must have belonged in characteristics, very similar to those of the Negroid type, to another human type never found in the area; in subsequent studies it was ascertained that it was a counterfeiting carried out at the time to justify the discontinuity between African negroids and European cro-magnons with a "missing link". Furthermore, this civilisation (called "Grimaldian Civilization" by the paleontologist Ugo Rellini), similar but not identical to that Aurignacian, already used the cult of the dead, as evidenced by the remains found there.

In Grimaldi and its surroundings there are protected areas of particular naturalistic value: the southern part, along the last stretch of State Road SS1 Aurelia, in the hamlet of Mortola Inferiore, falls in part in the SCI (Site of Community Importance) IT 1316118 of Capo Mortola, while the paths north of the built-up area of the hamlet of Grimaldi Superiore falls within the SCI IT 1315717 of Monte Grammondo and the Bevera torrent.

The site of Capo Mortola is represented by a strip of coast in which the natural vegetation has a "relict" character within a notably man-made territory, but which preserves the Hanbury Botanical Garden, a botanical garden of international importance.

The site of Monte Grammondo and the Bevera torrent is a landscape of considerable interest for the presence of significant forms of superficial karst erosion. In general, it is an interesting area of geologic tension between the Mediterranean and Alpine domains, with a significant presence of endemics. There are habitats of priority interest and the blooming of orchids is truly extraordinary. Equally interesting is the presence of disjoint stations of Paeonia officinalis and Acis nicaeensis, rare species, proposed by the Liguria Region for inclusion in Annex II of Directive 92/43 CEE. There are also several species protected by international directives / conventions. The presence of Ocellated lizard (Timon lepidus), a very rare species in Italy and having its eastern limit in Liguria, for which the conferment of priority species has been proposed (for the Italian populations only). Of great value for the rarity in Liguria of this type of environment, is the river area known as the "meanders of the Bevera".

Between the villages of Grimaldi and the French town of Garavan (Menton) there is a path called Passo della Morte (Pass of Death), travelled since the nineteenth century by those who want to go to France without having documents in order.

See also 

 Liguria
 Province of Imperia
 Ventimiglia
 Balzi Rossi caves
 Hanbury Botanical Garden
 House of Grimaldi

References 

Liguria
Province of Imperia